Sheung Shun is one of the 37 constituencies in the Kwun Tong District of Hong Kong which was created in 2007 and currently held by independent Fu Pik-chun.

The constituency loosely covers part of Shun Lee Estate, Shun Chi Court and Shun Lee Disciplined Services Quarters in Jordan Valley with the estimated population of 17,620.

Councillors represented

Election results

2010s

2000s

1990s

References

Constituencies of Hong Kong
Constituencies of Kwun Tong District Council
1994 establishments in Hong Kong
Constituencies established in 1994
Ngau Tau Kok